The Motorola Slvr (styled SLVR) is a series of mobile phones from Motorola, and is one of the series in the 4LTR line. The first phones were released in early 2005. They are designed to be very thin and lightweight.

Use by NSA

The SLVR is featured in the NSA ANT catalog as a variant costing $15,000 and containing a software-defined radio for covert surveillance.

L2

The Slvr L2 was introduced in 2005. The L2, which lacks a camera, external memory, and music features, is marketed specifically to corporate and government markets which generally prohibit their employees from using phones with the listed features. It is not marketed specifically under the Slvr designation.

Specifications

L6

The Slvr L6, also from early 2005, was released shortly before its heavily advertised brother, the L7 (see below). The L6 held the title of the thinnest mobile phone in the UK for a short while, before being beaten by the Samsung P300. Features of the L6 include Bluetooth, MP3 ring tones, camera and video on it. It is basically a cut-down version of the Slvr L7 with all functions except for iTunes (US only) and the use of external memory. The Slvr L6 also has a smaller screen than that of the Slvr L7.

A newer version of the L6 called L6i adds FM radio function.

Features
 Battery: Li-Ion, BC50 750/820 mAh
 Stand-by: up to 345 h
 Talk time: up to 5 h 50 min
 Dimensions: 113×49×10.9 mm, 56 cc
 Weight: 86 g
 Bands: Quad-band GSM 850/900/1800/1900 MHz for international roaming
 Display: CSTN, 65K colors
 Resolution: 128 x 160 pixels
 Camera: VGA, 640x480 pixels, supports 3GP and MP4 videos
 Ringtones: Polyphonic MIDI (24 channels), MP3, AMR, AAC
 Memory: 10 MB shared memory
 Data:	GPRS 	Class 10 (4+1/3+2 slots), 32 - 48 kbit/s
 Local connectivity: Bluetooth, miniUSB
 Browser:	WAP 2.0/xHTML

Specifications

Specific absorption rate
As of November 2005, (when it was first introduced) the Motorola Slvr L6 ranked as one of the ten highest-radiation phones in the United States at a digital SAR level of 1.58.

L7

The L7 was released at the same time as the L6 (early 2005), but the L7 is more professional, and is one of a few non-Apple branded phones released featuring iTunes support, allowing the user to play up to 100 downloaded songs that are stored on the phone's removable microSD card. It is known for its dedicated web browser and web video downloader which critics have said is the main feature of the Slvr. 

The Slvr L7 also features Bluetooth connectivity, a digital camera with 4x digital zoom and has a speakerphone.  Carried in the United States by Cingular Wireless, Metro PCS, and Cricket Communications, and carried in Canada by Rogers Wireless, it superseded the earlier Motorola ROKR E1, which was withdrawn from the market due to lackluster sales.  There is also a quad-band World Version of the L7 available internationally, which comes without the iTunes software. Instead, the standard Motorola Digital Audio Player is included.  The SD card is used for storing videos downloading from the web via GSM/GPRS.

Features
 Battery: Li-Ion 820 mAh
 Music Playback up to 12 hours
 Talk time: up to 6 hours 40 minutes
 Standby time: up to 350 hours
 Dimensions: 1.9 x 4.5 x .45 in. / 113 x 49 x 11.5 mm.
 Weight: 3.38 oz. / 96 g.
 Bands: Quad-band GSM 850/900/1800/1900 MHz for international roaming
 GPRS : Class 10 (2U/4D)
 Display: TFT, 256K colours, 176 x 220 resolution
 Memory: 11 MB internal (5 MB available to users), microSD (TransFlash) expansion card slot for up to 1 GB.
 Camera: VGA resolution (640x480)(0.3 megapixels), video-176x144=high resolution,
 With Tweek it is possible to increase from 3gp to MP4 (aka 3gp2) format with file size limit of 64 MB*
 Multimedia playback: MP3 (via iTunes for the US market, or Motorola's Digital Audio Player for the rest of the world), MPEG4, 3gp
 Local connectivity: Bluetooth, mini-USB

L7i/L7e/L71
This is a refresh version of the phone that features a 1.3megapixel camera, EDGE and some internal hardware changes - it is effectively a Motorola RIZR Z3 with a 1.3 MP camera in a candybar form factor. The various model designations are for different markets and case styles.  Note that the L7i is not the same phone as the "L7 i-Mode" - despite the very similar external appearance, the internal parts are almost completely different. The L7e will operate with a 2 GB micro SD card.

L7c
Similar to the original Slvr, this CDMA version offers a Sprint or Motorola music player which can hold as many songs as the size of the memory card in the phone. It also features EvDO high speed data. Currently the phone is offered by Sprint, Claro, U.S. Cellular, MetroPCS, Cricket Communications, and a silver version for Verizon Wireless. It comes in silver(Verizon Only), black, and red (Sprint only).

While Sprint's Music Store/Player ("powered by Groove Mobile") will list all songs on the SD card, it fails to play any that reside above the first 1 GB of space on the card, producing "Error M506". It also fails to play random tracks if some tracks have a long pathname (directory name length plus file name length), where "long" is approximately over 32 characters.

Verizon's version specifically prevents you sending audio files to the phone via Bluetooth (OBEX). Ringtones can, however, be transferred using free software, called BitPim.

Red L7
Partnering with Motorola, various British networks released a special Product Red Slvr and Bluetooth H3 headset to help support Global Fund programs which aim to positively impact the lives of women and children affected by HIV/AIDS in Africa.

Criticisms
When the battery is low, the Slvr emits a frequent loud beep, which is inconvenient in many settings. The beeping can be disabled by putting the phone in the silent or vibrate modes, or switching the phone off. The beeping stops when the battery is recharging.

Other specifications
The complete Motorola Slvr L7 list of specifications are:

L9/L72

The Slvr L9, known as the L72 in Asia, features a 2.0-megapixel camera which records Video at CIF 352*288, GPRS class 10 and EDGE class 10 support, FM radio and expandable memory of up to 2 GB. It was released in June 2007. It is an upgrade to the L7e, with an improved camera and FM radio.

See also
 Samsung Ultra Edition

References

Slvr
Mobile phones introduced in 2005